The Last Unicorn is a 1982 soundtrack album composed and arranged by Jimmy Webb and performed by America with the London Symphony Orchestra. The album contains the film score for the 1982 film The Last Unicorn, based on the novel of the same name by Peter S. Beagle. The title track got some airplay in Germany, where it was in the Top 100 hit for seven weeks, peaking at number 38.

Production
The Last Unicorn soundtrack was recorded at De Lane Lea Studios in Wimbley, England in 1982. It was released in Germany in 1982 by Virgin Records, but has not been released in the United States; it includes the film score's symphonic pieces. Studio singer Katie Irving is the singing voice in the film for Mia Farrow, though Jeff Bridges does his own singing.

Composition 
The title song is performed jointly by America and the London Symphony Orchestra, and plays in the film's opening credits while scenes based on The Hunt of the Unicorn tapestries form a backdrop. It is referred to later as a leitmotif by the film score.

Critical reception 
In his review for AllMusic, James Christopher Monger wrote:

Kyle Anderson of the website Nerdist wrote that Jimmy Webb and America were among the "many great people [who] were involved" with the 1982 film, and that the album's "songs work pretty well".

Singer Dan Avidan has stated on numerous occasions that the story was his favorite as a child.

Track listing

Personnel 
 Jimmy Webb – producer, arranger, composer
 Skip Mosher - arranger, composer (Credited as Skip Moser)
 London Symphony Orchestra – orchestra
 Dewey Bunnell – lead vocals , guitar, backing vocals
 Gerry Beckley – lead vocals , piano, backing vocals
 Michael Woods – lead guitar, backing vocals
 Brad Palmer – bass, backing vocals
 Willie Leacox – drums, percussion
 Katie Irving – vocals 
 Jeff Bridges – vocals

Covers 

 "That's All I've Got To Say" was covered in 1981 on Art Garfunkel's fifth solo studio album, Scissors Cut.
 "The Last Unicorn" was covered in 1994 by Kenny Loggins on his album Return to Pooh Corner.
 The band Groove Coverage released a dance version of "The Last Unicorn" on their album Covergirl in 2002.
 In 2015, Ninja Sex Party covered "The Last Unicorn" to promote a U.S. screening tour for the film hosted by the book's author Peter S. Beagle, later releasing it on their album Under the Covers.
 Leighton Meester and Scott Grimes covered "That's All I've Got To Say" in an episode of The Orville.
 Grimes covered the song again in a later episode.

References

External links 
Audio only video on America's official YouTube channel

1982 soundtrack albums
America (band) albums
Animated film soundtracks
Jimmy Webb albums
Albums arranged by Jimmy Webb
Albums produced by Jimmy Webb
Virgin Records soundtracks
Fantasy film soundtracks